Peter Joseph De Muth (January 1, 1892 – April 3, 1993) was an American businessman and politician who served one term as a Democratic member of the U.S. House of Representatives from Pennsylvania.

Biography
Peter J. De Muth was born in Pittsburgh, Pennsylvania on January 1, 1892.  He received a B.S. from the Carnegie Institute of Technology in Pittsburgh, and worked as a civil engineer from 1914 until his enlistment in the United States Navy as a chief machinist mate on July 15, 1918.  He returned to Pittsburgh and was employed as a sales manager from 1919 to 1922.  He was engaged in the real estate business and as a building contractor in 1922.

Congress 

De Muth was elected as a Democrat to the Seventy-fifth Congress.   He was an unsuccessful candidate for reelection in 1938.

Later career and death 
He resumed the real estate and building business in Pittsburgh until June 1949, when he moved to Los Angeles, California.  He continued to work in the real estate, insurance, and building business, and was a resident of Laguna Hills, California, until his death. He died on April 3, 1993, in Laguna Hills, California.

References

The Political Graveyard

1892 births
1993 deaths
Politicians from Pittsburgh
American centenarians
Men centenarians
United States Navy sailors
Military personnel from Pennsylvania
20th-century American politicians
Democratic Party members of the United States House of Representatives from Pennsylvania